No Sweat  may refer to:

 No Sweat (organisation), a not-for-profit organisation which fights for the well being and protection of sweatshop labourers
 No Sweat (TV series), a British television children's comedy show
 No Sweat (Blood, Sweat & Tears album), 1973
 No Sweat (Geordie album)
 No Sweat (band), an Irish rock band